This article lists the results for the Japan national football team between 1960 and 1969.

1960

1961

1962

1963

1964

1965

1966

1967

1968

1969

References 

Japan national football team results
1960s in Japanese sport